Genoveva Ríos (born 1865) was a Bolivian hero. She defended the Bolivian flag during an invasion by Chile in 1879.

Life
Ríos was born in Antofagasta in what was then Bolivia in 1865. She came to notice in 1879 at the outbreak of the War of the Pacific. Her town was invaded by Chile on 14 February. Her father had a senior position in the local police. Ríos noticed that the soldiers were seizing flags. She took a Bolivian flag, hid it from the soldiers, and took it to her parents. Her act was reported in the newspaper on 28 February.

Ríos died in Cochabamba but the year is unknown. Ríos's story is still reported as an example or heroism. Her town is now part of Chile.

References

1865 births
Year of death missing
Bolivian women